Tier 3 (aka TR3) was an influential but short-lived 300-capacity no wave art nightclub in New York. Founded by Hilary Jaeger in 1979, Tier 3 was a major venue in the city's underground music and counterculture post-punk art scene, along with the Mudd Club. Live performances showcased punk rock, no wave, ska, noise music, free jazz, new wave and experimental music. The club was located at 225 West Broadway in the TriBeCa neighborhood of lower Manhattan. 

Besides Hilary Jaeger, who booked the bands and ran Tier 3 (initially giving 100% of the door money to the bands), the DJs were Bob Gurevics and Simeon Gallu in addition to many guest DJs. The Lounge Lizards had one of their first gigs at Tier 3 and Lindzee Smith occasionally showed films of the No Wave Cinema on the third floor.

On the second floor, art and photography shows were hung. Kiki Smith, of Colab, painted a mural there. The third floor had a dance area lit by a disco ball.  On the first floor, in the bar area, there was a DJ booth that Jean-Michel Basquiat had painted. Basquiat also painted a mural on the wall between the bar room and the music room on the first floor, that had only a 10" stage, due to the low ceilings throughout. This low stage offered an intimate, face to face, relationship between musicians and the audience.

Tier 3 closed in December 1980. Jaeger and her crew quit Tier 3 in December 1980 at around the same time the club received an eviction notice.

Musical groups who performed at Tier 3
 DNA
 Rhys Chatham
 Bush Tetras
 Arsenal
 The Bongos
 Boris Policeband
 Glenn Branca
 Madness
 Liquid Liquid
 The Slits
 World Saxophone Quartet
 Z'EV
 ESG
 The dB's
 Stimulators
 8 Eyed Spy with Lydia Lunch
 The Raybeats
 Oliver Lake
 The Raincoats
 Robin Crutchfield's Dark Day
 Lounge Lizards
 Joseph Bowie
 Luther Thomas
 The Pop Group
 Delta 5
 Young Marble Giants
 Y Pants
 Ping Pong
 A Certain Ratio 
 Bauhaus
 Mumps
 Stare Kits
 Student Teachers
 Swinging Madisons
 X

Notes
Alan Moore and Marc Miller, eds., ABC No Rio Dinero: The Story of a Lower East Side Art Gallery (Colab 1985)
Marc Masters (2007), No Wave London, Black Dog Publishing
Carlo McCormick, The Downtown Book: The New York Art Scene, 1974–1984, Princeton University Press, 2006
Andy Schwartz, "RIP Tier 3", Perfect Sound Forever, 2008

References

Nightclubs in Manhattan
Former music venues in New York City
Noise music
No wave
Punk rock venues